Irish-Scots or Hiberno-Scots may refer to::

 Ulster Scots people
 Ulster Scots dialect
 Irish Scottish people

See also
 Ulster Scots (disambiguation) 
 Scots (disambiguation)
 Scott's (disambiguation)
 Scottish (disambiguation)
 Scotts (disambiguation)
 Scotch-Irish (disambiguation)

Language and nationality disambiguation pages